Lawrence "Lawrie" Lovell (born 14 August 1944 in Edinburgh, Scotland, United Kingdom) was a professional ice hockey player who played for the Fife Flyers and Murrayfield Racers in the United Kingdom. Lovell also played for the Great Britain national ice hockey team at five senior world championships. He was inducted to the British Ice Hockey Hall of Fame in 1992.

References
British Ice Hockey Hall of Fame entry

1944 births
Living people
British Ice Hockey Hall of Fame inductees
Fife Flyers players
Murrayfield Racers players
Sportspeople from Edinburgh
Scottish ice hockey forwards